Live 2, or Live II, or Live Two may refer to:

Live Two, album by Coil
Live II, album by Foghat
2nd Live, album by Golden Earring